Lieutenant General Sir Barnabas William Benjamin White-Spunner,  (born 1957) is a retired British Army officer, who was subsequently executive chairman of the Countryside Alliance until 2016. He is an author, a director of Burstock Ltd. and was appointed chairman of the advisory board of UK Fisheries Ltd in October 2018.

Military career
Educated at Eton College and the University of St Andrews, Barney White-Spunner was commissioned into the Blues and Royals in 1979. He was appointed Commanding Officer of the Household Cavalry in 1996 and in that capacity was deployed to Bosnia. In 1998, he was promoted to colonel and became Deputy Director of Defence Policy in the Ministry of Defence during the Strategic Defence and Security Review and in 2001 he took charge of Operation Essential Harvest, which was aimed at disarming Albanian insurgents in Macedonia.

He became commander of the 16 Air Assault Brigade in December 2000 and was given command of the Kabul Multinational Brigade in 2002 before becoming Chief of Joint Force Operations for the national contingent in the Middle East in 2003.

By 2005, he was chief of staff at Land Command and in 2007 he was appointed General Officer Commanding the 3rd (UK) Mechanised Division. In February 2008, he deployed with elements of 3rd (UK) Mechanised Division to Iraq where those elements formed HQ Multinational Division (South East). He went on to be Commander of the Field Army in 2009.

He was appointed Commander of the Order of the British Empire (CBE) in 2002 and Knight Commander of the Order of the Bath (KCB) in the 2011 Birthday Honours.

On 7 January 2010, White-Spunner gave evidence to the Iraq Inquiry regarding the Battle of Basra.

He retired from the British Army in December 2011 and was appointed Executive Chairman of the Countryside Alliance and Director of the Countryside Alliance Foundation in January 2012.

He retired from The Countryside Alliance in 2016. He subsequently became a director of Burstock Ltd. He was appointed chairman of the advisory board of UK Fisheries in October 2018.

Authorship
White-Spunner first wrote articles for The Field magazine in 1992. Publications (chronological order):
 co-authored with British Field Sports Society.
 co-authored with Simon Everett
 — Contains extracts from past editions of Baily's hunting directory.

References

|-

|-
 

|-

 

1957 births
People educated at Eton College
Alumni of the University of St Andrews
British Army generals
Commanders of the Order of the British Empire
Knights Commander of the Order of the Bath
Living people
British Army personnel of the Iraq War
Honourable Artillery Company officers
Blues and Royals officers
Officers of the Legion of Merit